Vance Oakley "Pat" Dickie (29 August 191816 May 2012) was an Australian politician of the state of Victoria, who held the Victorian Legislative Council seat of the Province of Ballarat from 1956 to 1978.

Biography
Dickie was born in Bacchus Marsh, Victoria on 29 August 1918, the youngest son of Charles Dickie and Daphne Annabelle Vance.  His education was initially in the Bacchus Marsh State and High Schools, and boarding to matriculation at Melbourne Grammar School.  Upon entering a professional career he was a manager for Lifeguard Milk Products Pty Ltd, Bacchus Marsh (1937–1940 and 1949–1960) and a director from 1960 to 1966. This professional career was interrupted by his enlisting in the Australian Imperial Force for World War 2 in 1940, where he served in the 2/2 Heavy AA Regiment, 2/5 Battery in the Middle East, Java, and Darwin, achieving the rank of sergeant before delisting in 1944.

Community participation in the years following the war saw him hold roles as Bacchus Marsh shire councillor 1948–1964, president of council 1948–1949, 1960–1961; president Bacchus Marsh State School committee 1951–1964, Bacchus Marsh High School Council 1957–1964, Bacchus Marsh RSL 1954–1956, Bacchus Marsh War Memorial Hospital 1956–1964; member Bacchus Marsh Water Trust and Sewerage Authority 1958–1964; trustee Caulfield, Bacchus Marsh and Dowling Forest Racecourses and member Victoria Racing Club, Victoria Amateur Turf Club, Moonee Valley Racing Club.

Dickie entered government in following a by-election for the Legislative Council seat of Ballarat Province in March 1956, where he ran as a candidate for the Liberal Party, a seat which he continued to hold until his resignation from parliament in August 1978.

During his time in the Bolte and Hamer governments, Dickie served as the Minister of State Development (July 1964 – Dec 1965 and June 1970 – Aug 1972), Minister of Health (September 1965 – June 1970), Minister for Tourism (June 1970 – Aug 1972), Minister of Immigration (December 1970 – Aug 1972), Minister of Housing (August 1972 – March 1976), Minister for Aboriginal Affairs (August 1972 – January 1975), and Chief Secretary (March 1976 – August 1978). He also served on the following committees of the Parliament of Victoria — Population Distribution committee 1961–1963 (chairman) and the Statute Law Revision committee 1958–1961. Within the party structure he was Secretary to cabinet 1964, deputy government Legislative Council leader 1972–1976, and government Legislative Council leader 1976–1978.

Personal
Dickie married Dorothy Jean Malcolm on 22 January 1944 and had three children. He died on 16 May 2012 in Bacchus Marsh.

References

Further reading
 Who's Who in Australia 1962–1977
 Eric White Associates Ltd, Victorian State Parliamentary and Civic Guide, Melbourne, 1960–74
 The Melbourne Herald 15 Aug 1978
 The Melbourne Age 16 Aug 1978
 Browne, G, Biographical Register of the Victorian Parliament 1900–84, 1985

|-

1918 births
2012 deaths
Members of the Victorian Legislative Council
Liberal Party of Australia members of the Parliament of Victoria
Australian Army soldiers
Australian Army personnel of World War II